Falls Park on the Reedy is a  park adjacent to downtown Greenville, South Carolina in the historic West End district. Considered the birthplace of Greenville, the park was founded in 1967 when the Carolina Foothills Garden Club reclaimed  of land that had been previously used by textile mills. Renovation accelerated in the late 1990s under Mayor Knox H. White, prompting the formation of the Falls Park Endowment, a private charity supporting ongoing development. Each summer the park is home to the Upstate Shakespeare Festival.

The park's most striking feature is a unique pedestrian bridge that curves around a waterfall on the Reedy River. It was designed by Boston firm Rosales + Partners with German firm Schlaich Bergermann & Partner as structural engineers and completed in the fall of 2004. It was awarded the Arthur G. Hayden medal for innovative design in 2005.

Near the bridge, the Main Street entrance to the park is graced by Bryan Hunt's . bronze sculpture Fall Lake Falls and contains a restaurant and other visitor amenities at the new Falls Park Center.

The park also features a collection of public gardens and a wall from the original 1776 grist mill built on the site.

References

External links

Liberty Bridge engineering details
Panoramic virtual tour of Falls Park from Liberty Bridge

Urban public parks
Parks in South Carolina
Geography of Greenville, South Carolina
Protected areas of Greenville County, South Carolina
Tourist attractions in Greenville, South Carolina
1967 establishments in South Carolina